Notre Dame Academy was founded in 2004 when St. Denis, St. Helen, and St. Lawrence Schools combined.  NDA was the first regional school formed in the Archdiocese of Louisville.  The school mascot is the Saint.

External links
 Notre Dame Academy website
 Top Workplace honors for Notre Dame

Roman Catholic schools in Louisville, Kentucky
Educational institutions established in 2004
2004 establishments in Kentucky
Catholic elementary schools in Kentucky
Private middle schools in Kentucky